Will Harvey (born 1967) is an American software developer and Silicon Valley entrepreneur. He wrote Music Construction Set (1984) for the Apple II, the first commercial sheet music processor for home computers. Music  Construction Set was ported to other systems by its publisher, Electronic Arts. He wrote two games for the Apple IIGS: Zany Golf (1988) and The Immortal (1990).  Harvey founded two consumer virtual world Internet companies: IMVU, an instant messaging company, and There, Inc., an MMOG company.

Career

Education
After high school, Harvey studied computer science at Stanford University, where he earned his Bachelor's, Master's, and Ph.D.  During this period, he started two game development companies and published several additional software products through Electronic Arts.

Early games
Harvey went to the Nueva School for middle school. He attended Crystal Springs and Uplands for high school. The first game Harvey developed was an abstract shooter for the Apple II called Lancaster (1983). He said:

Harvey contacted the president of Sirius, but the game was eventually released by minor publisher Silicon Valley Systems in 1983 and was not successful. The need for music in this game led to his development of 1984's Music Construction Set, published by Electronic Arts. It was a tremendous success.

Following the success of Music Construction Set, Harvey ported Atari Games's Marble Madness to the Apple II and the Commodore 64 (1986) and developed two original games, Zany Golf (1988) and The Immortal (1990). All three projects were for Electronic Arts. The Immortal and Zany Golf were written for the Apple IIGS and ported to other systems by EA.

Other companies
In the mid-90s, Harvey founded Sandcastle, an Internet technology company that addressed the network latency problems underlying virtual worlds and massively multiplayer games. Sandcastle was acquired by Adobe Systems.

Harvey was one of the chief technical architects at San Francisco game studio Rocket Science Games, a company which failed in 1997.

In 1998, Harvey went on to found There, Inc., which produced a virtual 3D world designed for online socializing.

In 2003, Harvey founded IMVU, which combined the idea of avatars with instant messaging.

In 2011, Harvey founded Finale Inventory, an inventory management system that helps companies achieve smooth running operations.

Games
Lancaster (1983, Silicon Valley Systems)
Music Construction Set (1984, Electronic Arts)
Marble Madness (1986, Electronic Arts) - port from the arcade game
Zany Golf (1988, Electronic Arts)
The Immortal (1990, Electronic Arts)

References

External links
Interview with Harvey about There from GameSpot
1984 episode of The Computer Chronicles, includes a segment of Harvey demonstrating the Music Construction Set, alongside John Chowning.

1967 births
Living people
American computer businesspeople
American computer programmers
Place of birth missing (living people)
Video game programmers
Stanford University alumni
Nueva School alumni
American businesspeople
Computer programmers